Worth the Wait is the debut extended play by Canadian country artist Lindsay Ell. It was released on March 24, 2017 through Stoney Creek Records. The collection was recorded in eight months between 2016 and 2017 following a string of one-off singles. Kristian Bush of Sugarland produced the EP. Worth the Wait includes a cover of John Mayer's "Stop This Train".

Background
Ell independently released an album titled Consider This through Maple Worldwide in December 2008. After moving to Nashville, Tennessee, she signed with record label Stoney Creek Records (a sister label to Broken Bow Records) in 2013. Five one-off singles were released between 2013 and 2016, with three charting on the American Country Airplay chart and the latest, "All Alright" (2016), reaching the top 10 on the Canada Country chart.

Ell met musician Kristian Bush in August 2016 and the two began recording the songs that would comprise Worth the Wait. The collection was inspired by John Mayer's 2006 album, Continuum, which Ell covered in full before working in earnest on her own EP. A cover of "Stop This Train" from that album was included on Worth the Wait.

Singles
"Waiting on You" was released to American country radio on May 29, 2017 as the record's lead single.

Critical reception
Laura Hostelley of Sounds Like Nashville wrote that the EP "shows off Ell's talent in all capacities, as a guitarist, vocalist and songwriter." Variety Beat commended the songs as being "deeply personal" and "relatable," and also wrote that the EP "is stacked with vulnerability and is deliberate in its sequence."

Commercial performance
Worth the Wait debuted at number 8 on the Nielsen SoundScan Country Albums chart and at number 28 on the Billboard Country Albums chart, which combines sales and streaming. The EP reached as high as number seven on the all-genre iTunes sales chart in the United States. It debuted at number 139 on the Billboard 200 chart dated April 15, 2017 and at number 36 on the Top Album Sales component chart.  The album has sold 6,300 copies in the US as of June 2017.

Track listing

Chart performance

References

2017 debut EPs
Lindsay Ell EPs
BBR Music Group EPs